Miguel Caballero Ortega  (born Madrid, 8 July 1982) is a Spanish ski mountaineer and ultramarathon runner. He is member of the mountain club of the Guardia Civil.

Selected results 
 2011:
 4th, World Championship, relay, together with Marc Pinsach Rubirola, Kílian Jornet Burgada and Javier Martín de Villa
 9th, World Championship, team, together with Marc Solá Pastoret
 2012:
 4th, European Championship, relay, together with Marc Pinsach Rubirola, Marc Solà Pastoret and Kílian Jornet Burgada
 8th, European Championship, team, together with Marc Solá Pastoret

External links 
 Miguel Caballero Ortega, skimountaineering.org

References 

1982 births
Living people
Spanish male ski mountaineers
Spanish ultramarathon runners
Athletes from Madrid
Male ultramarathon runners
Spanish male long-distance runners
Spanish sky runners